Oliver Holton Lauridsen (born 24 March 1989) is a Danish professional ice hockey defenceman who currently plays for the Malmö Redhawks of the Swedish Hockey League (SHL). He previously played for the Philadelphia Flyers of the National Hockey League (NHL). He is the older brother to Markus, who plays as a teammate with the Redhawks.

Playing career
Lauridsen hails from Gentofte, Denmark, where he started playing ice hockey in the youth ranks of IC Gentofte. He moved to Sweden in 2005 to join Rögle BK before heading to Linköping HC one year later. He played for both clubs at the youth level. In 2008, Lauridsen enrolled at St. Cloud State University.

He was drafted by the Philadelphia Flyers 196th overall in the 2009 NHL Entry Draft and signed a two-year entry-level contract with the Flyers on 15 March 2011 after his third season of college hockey at St. Cloud State.

On 29 March 2013, after spending one season with the Adirondack Phantoms he was called up to replace the injured Braydon Coburn. He debuted the next day in a game against the Boston Bruins. A month later, Lauridsen scored his first NHL goal after Boston defenseman Zdeno Chára's attempt to clear the puck deep in his own zone managed to slip past Boston goaltender Anton Khudobin and into the net. Lauridsen was credited with the goal since he was the last Flyers player to have touched the puck and it proved to be the game-winning goal. Two days later he scored the game-winner again, this time via a slapshot that eluded New York Islanders goaltender Kevin Poulin. During his time in North America, he played a total of 16 NHL contests for the Flyers and 264 games in the American Hockey League for the Adirondack Phantoms and Lehigh Valley Phantoms.

On 13 July 2015, Lauridsen signed with Frölunda HC of the Swedish Hockey League and helped the team win the Swedish national championship and the Champions Hockey League in the 2015–16 season. In April 2016, he penned a deal with Helsinki based KHL team Jokerit.

After four seasons in the KHL with Jokerit, Lauridsen opted to return to the SHL, agreeing to a three-year contract with the Malmö Redhawks on 29 April 2020.

Career statistics

Regular season and playoffs

International

References

External links
 

1989 births
Living people
Adirondack Phantoms players
Danish ice hockey defencemen
Frölunda HC players
Jokerit players
Lehigh Valley Phantoms players
Malmö Redhawks players
People from Gentofte Municipality
Philadelphia Flyers draft picks
Philadelphia Flyers players
St. Cloud State Huskies men's ice hockey players
Ice hockey players at the 2022 Winter Olympics
Olympic ice hockey players of Denmark
Sportspeople from the Capital Region of Denmark